William Edward Fichtner (born November 27, 1956) is an American actor. He is known for his television roles as Sheriff Tom Underlay on Invasion, Alexander Mahone on Prison Break, Carl Hickman on Crossing Lines, and Adam Janikowski on Mom. His film appearances include Heat, Contact, Armageddon, The Perfect Storm, Go, Crash, Black Hawk Down, and Teenage Mutant Ninja Turtles.

Early life
Fichtner was born on Mitchel Air Force Base on Long Island and raised in Cheektowaga, New York, a suburb of Buffalo. He is the son of Patricia A. (née Steitz) and William Frederick Fichtner. He has German ancestry.

He graduated from Maryvale High School in 1974. After graduating from Farmingdale State College in 1976 with an associate degree in criminal justice, he attended the College at Brockport, State University of New York and earned a Bachelor of Arts degree in criminal justice in 1978. He then studied at the American Academy of Dramatic Arts in New York. 

On May 18, 2008, Fichtner received an Honorary Doctorate of Humane Letters from Farmingdale State College. In his acceptance address, he credited Farmingdale admissions counselor Don Harvey with his decision to study acting. Harvey, who became a lifelong friend, took Fichtner to his first Broadway show.

Career 
Fichtner began his acting career as Josh Snyder in As the World Turns in 1987. He has since appeared in the films Contact, Heat, Armageddon, Go, Equilibrium, Black Hawk Down, The Perfect Storm, The Longest Yard, Crash, Ultraviolet, Drive Angry and The Dark Knight. Mainly a character actor, one of his few leading roles is in Passion of Mind, also starring Demi Moore and Stellan Skarsgård. His role in Crash won him a Screen Actors Guild Award for Outstanding Performance by a Cast in a Motion Picture award and a Best Acting Ensemble award from Broadcast Film Critics Choice. He appeared in the CBS sitcom Mom from 2015 to 2021.

Credited as Willian Fichtner in Vice City and Bill Fichtner in San Andreas, he voiced Ken Rosenberg in the video games Grand Theft Auto: Vice City and Grand Theft Auto: San Andreas. Between 2005 and 2006, he also starred in the sci-fi TV series Invasion as Sheriff Tom Underlay. After Invasion was canceled, he played ruthless FBI Agent Alexander Mahone in three seasons of Prison Break (2006–2009). In 2009, he co-presented the Vezina Trophy (for goal tending) at the National Hockey League awards show. He later guest starred as judge Christopher Mulready in The West Wing episode "The Supremes." He also had a role as the Gotham National Bank manager in the feature film The Dark Knight and as Jurgen in Equilibrium.

In June 2009, Fichtner had a recurring role as TV producer Phil Yagoda on Entourage. He also voiced Master Sergeant Sandman in the 2011 video game Call of Duty: Modern Warfare 3. He also played Eric Sacks in Teenage Mutant Ninja Turtles (2014).

Personal life
Fichtner is a fan of the NFL team the Buffalo Bills, and appeared in a commercial for them before the 2014 season. He narrated the ESPN 30 for 30 documentary Four Falls of Buffalo, chronicling their four consecutive Super Bowl appearances from 1990–93.

He is a close friend of his Black Hawk Down co-stars Kim Coates and Eric Bana.

Filmography

Film

Television

Video games

References

External links 

 
 "Random Roles: William Fichtner" at The A.V. Club 

1956 births
Living people
20th-century American male actors
21st-century American male actors
American Academy of Dramatic Arts alumni
American male film actors
American male soap opera actors
American male television actors
American male voice actors
American male video game actors
American people of German descent
Farmingdale State College alumni
Male actors from New York (state)
Outstanding Performance by a Cast in a Motion Picture Screen Actors Guild Award winners
People from Cheektowaga, New York
State University of New York at Brockport alumni